Robertson County Courthouse may refer to:

Robertson County Courthouse (Kentucky), Mount Olivet, Kentucky
Robertson County Courthouse (Tennessee), Springfield, Tennessee
Robertson County Courthouse and Jail, Franklin, Texas, listed on the National Register of Historic Places